S Pictures is a film production company managed by film director S. Shankar.

Filmography

Films produced

Films distributed
In addition to the films produced by S Pictures since 1999, the following films from other banners were distributed by the company:
 Prajapathi (2006)
 Kappal (2014)

See also
 S. Shankar

References

Film production companies of India
Film production companies based in Chennai
1999 establishments in Tamil Nadu
Indian companies established in 1999
Mass media companies established in 1999